The 12th Utah Senate District is located in Salt Lake and Tooele Counties, Utah, USA, and includes Utah House Districts 21, 22, 29, 32, 33, 38, and 42.

The current State Senator representing the 12th district is Daniel W. Thatcher.

Previous Utah State Senators (District 12)

Election results

2006 General Election

See also
 Brent H. Goodfellow
 Utah Democratic Party
 Utah Republican Party
 Utah Senate

External links
 Utah Senate District Profiles
 Official Biography of Brent H. Goodfellow

12
Salt Lake County, Utah
Tooele County, Utah